The men's 4 × 100 metre freestyle relay event at the 2014 Asian Games took place on 24 September 2014 at Munhak Park Tae-hwan Aquatics Center, South Korea.

Schedule
All times are Korea Standard Time (UTC+09:00)

Records

Results 
Legend
DNS — Did not start
DSQ — Disqualified

Heats

Final 

 South Korea originally won the bronze medal, but was later disqualified after Park Tae-hwan tested positive for Nebido.

References

Heats Results
Final Results

External links
Official website

Swimming at the 2014 Asian Games